Phyllocnistis abatiae is a moth of the family Gracillariidae, known from Argentina. The hostplant for the species is Abatia stellata.

References

Phyllocnistis
Endemic fauna of Argentina
Moths of South America